The Mount Barker District Council is a local government area centred on the town of Mount Barker just outside the Adelaide metropolitan area in South Australia.

The council was first established in October 1853. It expanded to four times its original size on 1 May 1935 as part of a major series of council amalgamations, absorbing the District Council of Nairne and parts of the District Council of Echunga and the District Council of Macclesfield.

Council
The current council as of December 2023 is:

Towns and localities 
Towns and localities in the Mount Barker District Council include:

See also
List of parks and gardens in rural South Australia

References

External links
Local Government Association
Official web site

Mount Barker, District Council of